Sandy Cross  may refer to:
Sandy Cross, East Sussex
Sandy Cross, Georgia
Sandy Cross, Surrey